Kadrina is a small borough in Lääne-Viru County, northern Estonia. It is the administrative centre of Kadrina Parish. Kadrina is located in the crossing point of Tallinn–Saint Petersburg (Tallinn–Narva) railway, Pärnu–Rakvere road (nr. 5) and the Loobu River. The nearest towns are Rakvere (12 km east) and Tapa (12 km southwest).

As of 2011 Census, the settlement's population was 2,269.

The name of Kadrina is derived from the St. Catherine's church and parish which establishment dates back to 1231. Earlier name of the settlement was Tõrvestevere.

The development from a village to larger settlement began after the Tallinn–Saint Petersburg railway was built and Kadrina railway station was established in 1870. A school was opened in 1902.

Gallery

References

External links

Kadrina Parish 

Boroughs and small boroughs in Estonia
Kreis Wierland